The Department for Exiting the European Union (DExEU; also known as the Department for Brexit or Brexit Department) was a department of the Government of the United Kingdom responsible for overseeing negotiations relating to Brexit, and establishing the future relationship between the United Kingdom and the EU. It was formed by the Prime Minister, Theresa May, in July 2016, in the wake of the referendum vote to leave the European Union. The department was dissolved on 31 January 2020 when Brexit took effect.

The department was formed by combining staff from the Cabinet Office’s Europe Unit, the Europe Directorate of the Foreign and Commonwealth Office, and the United Kingdom's Permanent Representation to the EU, and was able to take on staff from other government departments as necessary. The department was overseen by David Davis MP until he resigned on 8 July 2018. Dominic Raab was appointed as Secretary of State for Exiting the European Union on 9 July 2018, but resigned on 15 November 2018 over the draft withdrawal agreement. His replacement was announced on 16 November 2018 to be Steve Barclay.

Responsibilities 
The responsibilities of the department included:

 Achieve the best possible outcome for the UK's departure from the EU; and build a new ambitious, deep and special future partnership between the UK and the EU.
 Coordinate delivery and legislation across government, to ensure the UK is prepared for all scenarios, including a smooth transition to our future relationship with the European Union.
 Engage with Parliament, Member States and interested parties at home and abroad to shape a successful exit from the EU and to help build an ambitious future relationship.

Ministers
The Ministers in the Department for Exiting the European Union were as follows:

The first Permanent Secretary at the department was Oliver Robbins. In September 2017, Robbins left the department as the prime minister appointed him the EU adviser in the Cabinet Office. In October 2017, Philip Rycroft was appointed the new Permanent Secretary, having previously been the department's Second Permanent Secretary. After his departure in March 2019, he was replaced by Clare Moriarty, previously Permanent Secretary of the Department for Environment, Food and Rural Affairs.

Senior management 
The department's senior management team included:

 Permanent Secretary: Clare Moriarty
 UK Permanent Representative to the EU: Sir Tim Barrow KCMG LVO MBE
 Director General – Emma Ward
 Director General – Simon Ridley
 Acting Director General – Anna Clunes
 Director for Legislation & Constitution – Emma Payne
 Director for Analysis – Ben Cropper
 Co-Director for Market Access and Budget – Chris Hobley
 Co-Director for Market Access and Budget & DExEU Chief Scientific Adviser – Eoin Parker
 Director for Negotiations Strategy – Rhys Bowen
 Co-Director for Citizens and Networks – Rebecca Evernden
 Co-Director for Citizens and Networks – Nicola Webb
 Director for Security, Territories and Ongoing Business – VACANT
 Co-Director for Communications & Stakeholders – Olivier Evans
 Co-Director for Communications & Stakeholders – Simon Baugh
 Director for Business Engagement & Readiness – Nathan Phillips
 Co-Director for Domestic Policy & Implementation (Policy) – David Lamberti
Co-Director for Domestic Policy & Implementation (Implementation) – Colin Dingwall
Co-Director for Corporate Centre – Helen Mills
Co-Director for Corporate Centre – Kate Caulkin
DExEU Legal Advisers – Cathy Adams and Daniel Denman

Staff 
In March 2018 government data stated the department had 636 full-time equivalent posts, rising to 651 in August 2018 (excluding contractors, management consultants and fast streamers) on an average (mean) monthly wage of £5,890 including allowances.

References

External links
 

2016 establishments in the United Kingdom
Government agencies established in 2016
Brexit
Ministries established in 2016
2020 disestablishments in the United Kingdom
Government agencies disestablished in 2020
Ministries disestablished in 2020